Ernestine Durán Evans (September 17, 1917 – June 9, 2010) was a Spanish American legislator and civil servant. She served as Secretary of State of New Mexico from 1967 to 1970 and from 1975 to 1978.

Life
The daughter of a rancher and a schoolteacher, she was born in Alamosa, Colorado and grew up on a ranch in El Rito, New Mexico. She was educated at the Spanish American Normal School and earned a teaching certificate. She subsequently taught school at a lumber camp. Evans married Alcadio Griego. Her husband was running for the state legislature for the Democratic Party in 1941 when he died of spinal meningitis; she was asked by the party to run in his place in the election. She was elected and served a two-year term in the New Mexico House of Representatives. She then worked as an administrator for a military hospital during World War II. In 1945, she became an administrator in the New Mexico land office and, in 1953, a manager of finance for the state board of education. Evans was administrative secretary for two state governors and a member of the legislative council. In 1967, she was elected Secretary of State; she was elected again in 1975.

In 1986, she published Turquoise and Coral, stories about people from northern New Mexico.

Notes

References 

Year of birth uncertain
2010 deaths
Secretaries of State of New Mexico
Hispanic and Latino American women in politics
Women state legislators in New Mexico
People from El Rito, Rio Arriba County, New Mexico
People from Alamosa, Colorado
Democratic Party members of the New Mexico House of Representatives
20th-century American politicians
20th-century American women politicians
21st-century American women
1917 births